Park Jun-won (born 30 June 1986) is a South Korean professional golfer.

Park turned professional in 2006. He played on the Asian Tour from 2006 to 2010. His best finish was second place at the 2006 Philippine Open. He has played on the Korean Tour since 2007, winning once at the 2014 GS Caltex Maekyung Open. He played on the Japan Golf Tour in 2008 and again in 2016, winning the 2016 ISPS Handa Global Cup.

Professional wins (4)

Japan Golf Tour wins (1)

Japan Golf Tour playoff record (1–0)

OneAsia Tour wins (1)

1Co-sanctioned by the Korean Tour

Korean Tour wins (1)

1Co-sanctioned by the OneAsia Tour

Japan Challenge Tour wins (2)

References

External links

South Korean male golfers
Japan Golf Tour golfers
1986 births
Living people